, born , was a Japanese actor, screenwriter and film director. He directed eleven films (one short and ten features), all of which he wrote himself.

Early life
Itami was born Yoshihiro Ikeuchi in Kyoto. The name Itami was passed on from his father, Mansaku Itami—who was a renowned satirist and film director before World War II.

At the end of the war, when he was in Kyoto, Itami was chosen as a prodigy and educated at Tokubetsu Kagaku Gakkyū ("the special scientific education class") as a future scientist who was expected to defeat the Allied powers. Among his fellow students were the sons of Hideki Yukawa and Sin-Itiro Tomonaga. This class was abolished in March 1947.

He moved from Kyoto to Ehime Prefecture when he was a high school student. He attended the prestigious Matsuyama Higashi High School, where he was known for being able to read works by Arthur Rimbaud in French. But, due to his poor academic record, he had to remain in the same class for two years. It was here that he became acquainted with Kenzaburō Ōe, who later married his sister. When it turned out that he could not graduate from Matsuyama Higashi High School, he transferred to Matsuyama Minami High School, from which he graduated.

After failing the entrance exam for the College of Engineering at Osaka University, Itami worked at times as a commercial designer, a television reporter, a magazine editor, and an essayist.

Acting career

Itami studied acting at an acting school called Butai Geijutsu Gakuin in Tokyo. In January 1960 he joined Daiei Film and was given the stage name  by Masaichi Nagata. In May 1960, Itami married Kazuko Kawakita, the daughter of film producer Nagamasa Kawakita. He first acted on screen in Ginza no Dora-Neko (1960). In 1961 he left Daiei and started to appear in foreign-language films such as 55 Days at Peking. In 1965 he appeared in the big-budget Anglo-American film Lord Jim. In 1965 he published a book of essays which became a hit, Yoroppa Taikutsu Nikki ("Diary of boredom in Europe"). In 1966 he and Kazuko agreed to divorce.

In 1967, when working with Nagisa Oshima on a film Sing a Song of Sex (Nihon Shunka Kō) he met Nobuko Miyamoto. He and Miyamoto married in 1969. Around this time, he changed his stage name to "伊丹 十三" (Itami Jūzō) with the kanji "十" (ten) rather than "一" (one), and worked as a character actor in film and television.

In 1968 he played Saburo Ishihara, the father of Takeshi and Koji during season II, in the series for children Cometto-San. He became well-known for these series in most Spanish-speaking countries, along with Yumiko Kokonoe. who played Cometto-San.

In the 1970s, he joined the TV Man Union television production company and produced and presented documentaries for television, which influenced his later career as a film director. He also worked as a reporter for a TV programme called Afternoon Show.

In 1983, Itami played the father in Yoshimitsu Morita's The Family Game, and The Makioka Sisters for which roles he won the Yokohama Film Festival and Hochi Film Award for Best Supporting Actor.

Aside from the acting career, he translated several English books to Japanese, including Papa, You're Crazy by William Saroyan.

Itami was the brother-in-law of Kenzaburō Ōe and an uncle of Hikari Ōe.

Director

Itami's debut as director was the movie Osōshiki (The Funeral) in 1984, at the age of 50. This film proved popular in Japan and won many awards, including Japanese Academy Awards for Best Picture, Best Director, and Best Screenplay. However, it was his second movie, the 1985 "noodle western" Tampopo, that earned him international exposure and acclaim.

His following film A Taxing Woman (1987) was again highly successful. It won six major Japanese Academy awards and spawned a sequel A Taxing Woman's Return in 1988. The central character, played by his wife Nobuko Miyamoto who appeared in all his films, became a pop culture heroine. This was followed by his fifth film A-Ge-Man: Tales of a Golden Geisha.

Itami directed the anti-yakuza satire Minbō no Onna as his sixth feature. On May 22, 1992, six days after the release of the film, Itami was attacked, beaten, and slashed on the face by five members of the Goto-gumi, a Shizuoka-based yakuza clan, who were angry at Itami's film's portrayal of yakuza members. This attack led to a government crackdown on the yakuza.

His subsequent stay in a hospital inspired his next film Daibyonin (1993), a grim satire on the Japanese health system. During a showing of this film in Japan, a cinema screen was slashed by a right-wing protester.

He directed another three films before his death.

Death
Itami died on December 20, 1997 in Tokyo, after falling from the roof of the building where his office was located. On his desk was found a suicide note written on a word processor stating that he had been falsely accused of an affair and was taking his life to clear his name. Two days later, a tabloid magazine published a report of such an affair. 

However, no one in Itami's family believed that he would have taken his life or that he would be mortally embarrassed by a real or alleged affair. In 2008, a former member of the Goto-gumi, a yakuza group, told a reporter, Jake Adelstein: "We set it up to stage his murder as a suicide. We dragged him up to the rooftop and put a gun in his face. We gave him a choice: jump and you might live or stay and we'll blow your face off. He jumped. He didn't live."

Tributes
His brother-in-law and childhood friend Kenzaburo Oe wrote The Changeling (2000), which is based on their relationship.

There is a Juzo Itami Museum in Matsuyama.

Filmography

Actor

As director

Awards
 1985 Japan Academy Prize for Director of the Year—The Funeral
 1988 Japan Academy Prize for Director of the Year—A Taxing Woman

References

External links
 
 
 Juzo Itami's grave
 Itami Juzo Museum 
 

1933 births
1997 deaths
20th-century Japanese male actors
Critics of Sōka Gakkai
Japan Academy Prize for Director of the Year winners
Japanese film directors
Japanese male film actors
People from Kyoto
Suicides by jumping in Japan
Yakuza film directors
1997 suicides